June Marieezy, also known as ((( O ))), is a Filipino-American, singer and songwriter. The artistic moniker ((( O ))) is unpronounceable. The creative syntax symbolizes the artist's energetic presence. It also makes searching for her online more difficult which is a permanent fixture in keeping her mind off of creating music to gain fame.

Early life 
June was born in Dallas, Texas. June returned to the Philippines in 2008 and spent 5 years studying music in Manila. 

She chose the unpronounceable name of ((( O ))) because she does not resonate with her birth name. She prefers the energy-based representation of who she is found in her artistic name. Her artistic name makes it difficult to find June's music online which helps her focus on creating music instead of chasing clout.

Personal life 
In 2015, June met her future-husband and fellow musician, French Kiwi Juice (aka FKJ) while performing on stage. 

FKJ announced the couple had a child in the winter of 2019 on Instagram.
In 2019, the song "100 Roses" was written to commemorate the death of their newborn child.
On July 30, 2021, June Marieezy released the music video for "Bayou" announcing her pregnancy and showcasing her belly bump.

Career 
During her time in Manila, she cultivated a local audience that has since catapulted her to international stages. She has performed all around the world including Hong Kong, The Juicebox in London, and Urbanscapes in Malaysia.

June Marieezy's first and most popular song on Spotify is FKJ's remix of 'Fly' off the Virgo EP. The two also played at the Malasimbo Music & Arts Festival in 2015 in the Philippines.

In 2018, June announced she would be releasing new music every full moon for 12 years, known as moondrops.

June Marieezy's was featured in the music video for Vibin' Out with ((( O ))) on FKJ's self-titled album.

References 

Living people
American women singer-songwriters
Musicians from Dallas
Singer-songwriters from Texas
Year of birth missing (living people)
American musicians of Filipino descent
21st-century American singers
Musicians work group articles needing attention
21st-century American women